Frank J. Burt was a professional baseball player who primarily played left field in the American Association for the 1882 Baltimore Orioles.

External links

Baltimore Orioles (AA) players
Major League Baseball outfielders
Baseball players from Camden, New Jersey
19th-century baseball players